Friedhelm Schütte (born 12 August 1957) is a former professional German footballer.

Schütte made a total of 4 appearances in the Fußball-Bundesliga and 175 in the 2. Bundesliga during his playing career.

References 
 

1957 births
Living people
German footballers
Association football midfielders
Bundesliga players
2. Bundesliga players
FC Schalke 04 players
1. FC Bocholt players
SC Preußen Münster players
Tennis Borussia Berlin players
SpVgg Bayreuth players
Sportspeople from Gelsenkirchen
Footballers from North Rhine-Westphalia